Nayt (born 9 November 1994) is an Italian rapper.

He debuted in 2011 with the single "No Story" and his first album titled Nayt One was released on 7 May 2012. Nayt is best known for his trilogy Raptus (2015), Raptus 2 (2017) and Raptus 3 (2019), re-released in a collection box edition by Jive Records on 10 May 2019. He also appears in the album "Ali" by Il Tre in the track "Fight!", released February 27, 2020 as a single from the album.

Discography

Albums 
 Nayt One (2012)
 Shitty Life Mixtape (2013)
 Six of Sixteen (EP; 2014) 
 Raptus (2015)
 Un bacio (2016)
 Raptus 2 (2017)
 Raptus 3 (2019)
 Mood (2020)
 Doom (2021)

References

Italian rappers
Living people
People from Isernia
21st-century Italian singers
1994 births